Scott Powell (born August 13, 1948) is an American musician and a former founding member of Sha Na Na, which began at Columbia University in 1969, under the name The Kingsmen. The group's name was later changed to avoid confusion with another band of the same name.

Powell performed with Sha Na Na at the Woodstock Festival and in Japan and Europe. He was known as Santini on the Sha Na Na television series, which aired from 1977 to 1981. He sang many Elvis Presley songs on the show. He was also in the movie Grease with Sha Na Na, singing lead on the song Hound Dog. When Powell left the group in 1981, he went back to Columbia and took premedical courses, and has pursued a successful career as an orthopedic surgeon.

Education
Hotchkiss School
 Columbia College of Columbia University
 New York University
 Albert Einstein College of Medicine 
 St. Lukes-Roosevelt Hospital Center
 NYU Hospital for Joint Diseases
 Kerlan-Jobe Orthopedic Clinic in Los Angeles

Current status

As of August 2007, Powell is a Board Certified orthopedic surgeon, founded Powell Orthopedics and Sports Medicine, which  has two locations in California. He provides such services as tennis elbow release, arthroscopic rotator cuff repair and total shoulder replacement.

He serves in many capacities in the medical field, including being active in the Arthroscopy Association of North America, the American Orthopedic Society of Sports Medicine, and the American Academy of Orthopedic Surgeons. 

Powell is Team Physician for the United States Soccer Federation Women's National Team, and is on the medical staffs of both the U.S. Soccer National Team and the United States Olympic Committee, and on the Board of Directors of United Cerebral Palsy.  He is also Clinical Professor at the USC Keck School of Medicine.

Powell is married to  Cynthia Boxrud, M.D., who is an oculoplastic and reconstructive surgeon.

Movie appearances
 1970 – Woodstock – as himself with Sha Na Na
 1972 – Dynamite Chicken – as himself with Sha Na Na
 1978 – Grease – with Sha Na Na as Johnny Casino and The Gamblers
 1980 – Caddyshack – Gatsby
 1994 – Woodstock Diary – as himself with Sha Na Na
 2003 – Festival Express – as himself with Sha Na Na

References
 https://www.imdb.com/name/nm0763753/
 http://www.scottpowellmd.com/about.htm

External links
 Dr. Scott Powell, Orthopedic Surgery
 Sha Na Na official site
 Columbia College
 St. Lukes-Roosevelt Hospital Center
 NYU Hospital for Joint Diseases
 Kerlan-Jobe Orthopedic Clinic in Los Angeles
 Powell Orthopedics and Sports Medicine
 Cynthia Boxrud, M.D.

1948 births
Living people
American rock singers
Sha Na Na members
Hotchkiss School alumni
Columbia College (New York) alumni
New York University alumni
Albert Einstein College of Medicine alumni
Keck School of Medicine of USC faculty
American orthopedic surgeons